John Robert Gorman (born December 11, 1925) is an American prelate of the Roman Catholic Church. Gorman served as an auxiliary bishop of the Archdiocese of Chicago in Illinois from 1988 to 2003.  During his tenure as auxiliary bishop, Gorman was instrumental in the creating of the first internal review panel for sexual abuse allegations in an American archdiocese.

Biography

Early life
John Gorman was born in Chicago, Illinois, on December 11, 1925.  He first attended Visitation Elementary School in Chicago, then went to the Archbishop Quigley Preparatory Seminary, in Chicago. Gorman then attended St. Mary of the Lake Seminary in Mundelein, Illinois, where he was awarded his Licentiate in Theology and Bachelor of Theology degree.Gorman later received Master of Psychology and Doctor of Clinical Psychology degrees from Loyola University Chicago.

Priesthood 
On May 1, 1956, Gorman was ordained a priest for the Archdiocese of Chicago by Cardinal Samuel Stritch. After his ordination, Gorman served as an associate pastor in the Chicago parishes of St. Andrew, St. Odilo, and St. Nicholas of Tolentine.  At the same time, he was a faculty member at Archbishop Quigley, the Niles College Seminary in Chicago, the Loyola Pastoral Studies Institute in Chicago, and the Notre Dame University summer school.

In 1965, Gorman was appointed president of St. Mary of the Lake Seminary.  At that time, the Second Vatican Council was changing seminarian education worldwide.  In a 2021 interview, Gorman remarked:When I was there (as a seminarian), everything was silent in the buildings and everything was concentrated on the individual. Vatican II defined the church as being in service to the people. We started doing things with the seminarians in groups, with prayer and formation. We sent them out to the parishes when they were still in seminary so they could have contact with the people, because that’s where the guys would be working.In 1973, Gorman was assigned as pastor to St. Michael Parish in Orland Park, Illinois.  Gorman became director of the Department of Parish/Pastoral Services in 1986.

Auxiliary Bishop of Chicago
On February 16, 1988,  Pope John Paul II appointed Gorman as an auxiliary bishop of the Archdiocese of Chicago and titular bishop of Catula. He was consecrated on April 11, 1988, by Cardinal Joseph Bernardin. Gorman was first assigned as episcopal vicar of Vicariate I in the archdiocese. In 1990, he was appointed as vicar general/vicar for regional services. In 1995, the archbishop assigned Gorman to Vicariate V.

In 1992, Gorman served on a three-person commission investigating sexual abuse allegations in the archdiocese and how the archdiocese was handling them. The commission singled out 59 allegations of sexual abuse against priests, 39 of them being well founded. On June 16, 1992, the commission released its recommendations, including the establishment of an independent review panel to judge all allegations. Bernadin later implemented the proposed reforms.

On January 24, 2003, Gorman's letter of retirement as auxiliary bishop of the Archdiocese of Chicago was accepted by John Paul II.

See also
 

 Catholic Church hierarchy
 Catholic Church in the United States
 Historical list of the Catholic bishops of the United States
 List of Catholic bishops of the United States
 Lists of patriarchs, archbishops, and bishops

References

External links

 Roman Catholic Archdiocese of Chicago

Episcopal succession

1925 births
Living people
Clergy from Chicago
20th-century American Roman Catholic titular bishops
Roman Catholic Archdiocese of Chicago
Christianity in Chicago
21st-century American Roman Catholic titular bishops
Religious leaders from Illinois
Catholics from Illinois